Pars descendens may refer to:

 Descending aorta, also known by the Latin term pars descendens aortae
 Descending limb of loop of Henle, also known by the Latin term pars descendens ansa nephrica